Lochnericine is a major monoterpene indole alkaloid present in the roots of Catharanthus roseus. It is also present in Tabernaemontana divaricata.

Chemistry

Synthesis 
Lochnericine is formed from stereoselective epoxidation of carbons 6 and 7 of tabersonine.

Derivatives

See also 
 Pericine
 Pervine
 Tabersonine
 Vincamine

References 

Indole alkaloids
Alkaloids found in Apocynaceae